Edward Newitt (29 January 1866 – 4 May 1952) was a British sports shooter. He competed in two events at the 1908 Summer Olympics.

References

1866 births
1952 deaths
British male sport shooters
Olympic shooters of Great Britain
Shooters at the 1908 Summer Olympics
People from Roehampton
Sportspeople from London